York Conferences is a subsidiary of the University of York (York, UK) and is the commercial body responsible for the organisation and management of conferences and events across the University of York's three campuses: Campus West, Campus East and the King's Manor in York city centre; With a maximum venue capacity of 1190, the venues at the University of York host some of the largest events in North Yorkshire.

Currently, the York Conferences office is based at the University of York's West Campus in Grimston House.

2020 marks 50 years since the first conference officer was appointed in 1970.

York Conferences are accredited by the Meetings Industry Association (MIA). In addition, in 2009 York Conference Park Ltd achieved the Customer First and Investors In People (IIP) standards.

Notable Previous Clients
 General Synod of the Church of England
 Samaritans
 Citizens Advice Bureau
 Royal Society for the Protection of Birds
 Association of University Chief Security Officers
 Bat Conservation Trust

References

External links
 Official website
 University of York

University of York